STANAG 3350 (Analogue Video Standard for Aircraft System Applications) is a NATO analog video Standardization Agreement for military aircraft avionics.

Video-capable sensors such as radars, FLIR, or video-guided missiles often provide a STANAG 3350 video output. STANAG3350 video is supplied as a component RGB signal with timing similar to a corresponding civilian composite video standard such as NTSC, PAL, or RS-343. Only the vertical and carrier frequency of the signal are defined by the standard, the horizontal resolution can vary from one implementation to another and still satisfy the STANAG 3350 standard.

Versions of the standard
The three different versions of the standard, which are all interlaced formats, are each based on a different civil conventional standard:
 STANAG 3350 Class A: 875 Lines, 30 Frames/ Sec, 60 Fields/ Sec, based on RS-343 RGB, now EIA-343A
 STANAG 3350 Class B, 625 Lines, 25 Frames/ Sec, 50 Fields/ Sec, based on PAL
 STANAG 3350 Class C, 525 Lines, 30 Frames/ Sec, 60 Fields/ Sec, based on NTSC RS-170A

See also
 Component video
 STANAG

References

External links
 US Department of Defense quick search for military standards (type 3350 for document number)

3350
Aviation standards